Kalnirnay is a calmanac (Calendar + Almanac) published in India. The almanac gives simplified information about the Panchang, auspicious days, festivals, holidays, sunrise and sunset. It has recipes, stories on health and education, monthly Bhavishya and articles on Hindu astrology.

History 
Kalnirnay was founded in 1973 by Jayantrao Salgaonkar. It initially started as a hand-printed almanac for Marathi subscribers. The logo and typography was designed by Kamal Shedge. The first issue was sold to 10,000 subscribers. It gradually grew to become the largest selling publication in the world, with around 19 million copies being sold annually.

Its website was launched in 1996, its desktop e-version (e-kalnirnay) was subsequently launched, and it is now available as an android and iOS application.

Publication and contents 

Kalnirnay is published annually, by Sumangal Publishing, as a calendar almanac for all Indian religions. It contains auspicious dates, festivals and celebrations of Hindus, Muslims, Christians, Sikhs, Jains, Buddhists, Parsis and Jews in detail. It also provides useful information about Daily Panchanga, auspicious times for weddings (Muhurat), Daily Sun Rise – Moon Rise Timings, Sankashti Chaturthi Chandroday (Moon rise) Timing, Monthly Astrological Predictions for all Zodiac Signs, etc. It is published in nine languages – English, Marathi, Hindi, Gujarati, Tamil, Telugu, Kannada, Malayalam and Punjabi with Marathi accounting for the bulk of its readers.
In addition to dates and times of religious and cultural relevance, each issue also contains articles on topics such as health, food and beauty.

Products 
 Kalnirnay Language Editions: almanac available in 7 languages
 Kalnirnay Special Editions: Swadishtha & Aarogya
 Kalnirnay Other Editions: Office, Car & Desk Editions
 Panchang
 Books

Services 
 Muhurat
 Compatibility Reports
 Janam Patrika
 Kundali Matching
 Know your gem

References

Companies based in Mumbai
Almanacs
Publishing companies established in 1973
Indian brands
1973 establishments in Maharashtra
Indian companies established in 1973